Jim Baker is a Canadian politician from Newfoundland and Labrador, Canada.

Baker represented the district of Labrador West in the Newfoundland and Labrador House of Assembly as a member of the Progressive Conservative Party. Baker was first elected in a 2007 by-election, and was re-elected later that year in the provincial election. Baker did not run for re-election in the 2011 provincial election.

Election results 

|-

|-

|NDP
|Darrel J. Brenton 
|align="right"|1848
|align="right"|41.59%
|align="right"|
|-

|Liberal
|Karen Oldford
|align="right"|287
|align="right"|6.61%
|align="right"|
|}

{| class="wikitable"
|- style="background-color:#E9E9E9"
! colspan="6"|2007 Labrador West provincial by-electionResignation of Randy Collins
|- style="background-color:#E9E9E9"
! colspan="2" style="width: 200px"|Party
! style="width: 170px"|Candidate
! style="width: 40px"|Votes
! style="width: 40px"|%
! style="width: 40px"|+/-

| style="width: 185px"|Progressive Conservative
|Jim Baker
|align=right|1,666
|align=right|41.6
|align=right|
|-

| style="width: 185px"|NDP
|Darrel Brenton
|align=right|1,240
|align=right|31.0
|align=right|
|-

| style="width: 185px"| Labrador Party
|Ron Barron
|align=right|670
|align=right|16.7
|align=right|
|-

| style="width: 185px"| Liberal
|Karen Oldford
|align=right|427
|align=right|10.7
|align=right|

References

Progressive Conservative Party of Newfoundland and Labrador MHAs
Living people
People from Labrador City
21st-century Canadian politicians
Year of birth missing (living people)